John Paizs (born in 1957) is a Canadian director, writer and actor. In 1985 his independent comedy Crime Wave was presented at the Toronto International Film Festival. He was the male lead and also wrote and directed the film.

Born in Winnipeg, Manitoba, Paizs has worked on several TV series and directed the 1999 feature film Top of the Food Chain, a sendup of Golden Age '50s science fiction movies.

Filmography (director) 
The Obsession of Billy Botski (1980)
Springtime in Greenland (1981)
Oak, Ivy, and Other Dead Elms (1982)
The International Style (1983)
Crime Wave (1985)
The Kids in the Hall (1988, TV series)
Maniac Mansion (1990, TV series)
The Adventures of Shirley Holmes (1996, TV series)
Once A Thief (1997, TV series)
Top of the Food Chain (1999)
Marker (2005)

References

External links

1957 births
Living people
Canadian male film actors
Canadian male screenwriters
Canadian people of Hungarian descent
Film directors from Winnipeg
Male actors from Winnipeg
Writers from Winnipeg